Martín Sarrafiore (born 20 July 1997), is an Argentine professional footballer who plays as an attacking midfielder for Independiente

Career

Internacional
On 3 June 2019 Sarrafiore signed with Internacional on a free transfer.

Career statistics

References

External links

1997 births
Living people
Argentine footballers
Argentine expatriate footballers
Association football midfielders
Club Atlético Huracán footballers
Sport Club Internacional players
Coritiba Foot Ball Club players
CR Vasco da Gama players
Campeonato Brasileiro Série A players
Campeonato Brasileiro Série B players
Expatriate footballers in Brazil
Sportspeople from Buenos Aires Province